Galalaukiai is a village in the eastern part of Ignalina district in Lithuania. It is located 1 kilometres east of Didžiasalis and 1 kilometres east of Dysna village near the border with Belarus. According to the 2011 census, it had 25 residents.

References 

Villages in Utena County
Sventsyansky Uyezd
Wilno Voivodeship (1926–1939)
Ignalina District Municipality